The Xavier Musketeers men's basketball team represents Xavier University in Cincinnati, Ohio. The school's team currently competes in the Big East Conference, and are coached by Sean Miller. Xavier has appeared in the NCAA tournament 29 times, 16 times in the 18 tournaments between 2001 and 2018. On March 11, 2018, Xavier earned its first ever No. 1 seed in the NCAA Tournament. Xavier is also a two-time winner of the NIT, with their most recent championship coming in 2022.

Xavier won four Atlantic 10 tournament championships (1998, 2002, 2004 and 2006). Xavier has won or shared 17 regular season conference championships, while winning 9 conference tournament championships. In addition, they have won one Big East Conference regular season title in 2018. They made the 2023 Big East Championship but lost to the Marquette Golden Eagles.

Xavier has been listed among the top-20 most valuable college basketball teams.

History

The first Xavier basketball game on record was February 20, 1920 at the Fenwick Club in Cincinnati. Coached by Joe Meyer, the Musketeers compiled a 94–52 record during Meyer's's 13-year run as head coach from 1920 to 1933. The Musketeer's success continued under second head coach Clem Crowe. During Crowe's 10 years as Xavier head coach, Xavier compiled a record of 96–78. Crowe's 96 wins as a head coach rank fourth all-time among Xavier head coaches.

Following the 1942–43 season, play was suspended for the following two seasons because of World War II. In 1945, the program resumed under the leadership of head coach Ed Burns. In his one season as head coach, Burns compiled a record of 3–16.

In 1946, Burns was replaced by Lew Hirt. Under Hirt, the Musketeers first postseason appearance was in the National Association of Intercollegiate Athletics (NAIA) during the 1948 NAIA National Basketball tournament, the national tournament for small colleges. Xavier finished in 4th place, losing to Hamline University in the national third-place game, 58–59. 1948 was the only year Xavier appeared in the NAIA tournament.

In 1951, Hirt was replaced as head coach by Ned Wulk. Wulk guided the Musketeers to National Invitational Tournament appearances in 1956 and 1957. The 1956 appearance marked Xavier's first NIT win, an 84–80 victory over Saint Louis.

After a loss to Bradley in the 1957 NIT, Wulk was replaced as head coach by Jim McCafferty. McCafferty led the Musketeers back to a third straight NIT in 1958. With wins over Niagara, Bradley, St. Bonaventure and Dayton, Xavier captured the NIT. According to most college basketball historians, the NIT was the elite post season tournament until the NCAA overtook it in the early 1960s. That was the first postseason championship won by any Ohio Division I school.

In 1961, McCafferty led Xavier to their first appearance in the NCAA Division I men's basketball tournament. On March 14, 1961, Xavier fell to Morehead State at the Kentucky State Fairgrounds in Louisville, Kentucky.

McCafferty was replaced as head coach in 1963. He would be followed by Don Ruberg (1963–67), George Krajack (1967–71), Dick Campbell (1971–73) and Tay Baker (1973–79).

In 1979, Xavier was one of the charter members of the Midwestern City Conference (nicknamed the MCC or Midwestern City 6, and now known as the Horizon League), which also included Butler, Evansville, Loyola (Chicago), Oklahoma City, and Oral Roberts. That year also marked the hiring of head coach Bob Staak, who compiled an 88–86 record during his six seasons as head coach, including a return to both the NCAA Tournament and NIT.

Pete Gillen era
1985 once again marked considerable change for the program. In addition to the hiring of head coach Pete Gillen, the Midwestern City Conference altered its name slightly to the Midwestern Collegiate Conference, adding more teams including Detroit, Notre Dame (excluding men's basketball and football), Saint Louis, Marquette and Dayton. The MCC is the predecessor to the present-day Horizon League. Xavier was a member of the MCC from 1979 to 1995 and won eight regular season and six conference tournament championships.

From 1985 to 1994, Gillen compiled a 202–75 record, including the program's first five wins in the NCAA Tournament. The Musketeers advanced to the NCAA Tournament in six of Gillen's nine years at the helm. In 1990, Xavier beat Kansas State and future Big East colleagues Georgetown to advance to the program's first Sweet Sixteen.

Skip Prosser era
Skip Prosser was hired in the spring of 1994 to replace departed head coach Pete Gillen. In his seven seasons as head coach, Prosser compiled a 148–65 record with four NCAA tournament appearances. Prosser's 148 wins are third all-time at Xavier. During his time at Xavier, Prosser continued to build on the momentum Gillen had created. Early in his tenure, Prosser added recruits Gary Lumpkin, Darnell Williams, Lenny Brown and James Posey. Those four players provided the core of Prosser's success during his time at Xavier. After missing the NCAA Tournament in both 1999 and 2000, Xavier returned to the tournament in 2001. Following a loss to Notre Dame in the tournament's first round, Prosser accepted the position of head coach at Wake Forest.

Thad Matta era
Thad Matta left alma mater Butler to replace Skip Prosser as Xavier's head coach in 2001. Hired with only one year of head coaching experience, Matta inherited a talented core of players in David West, Lionel Chalmers, and Romain Sato. During his three years at the helm, Matta compiled a record of 78–23, with three straight NCAA tournament appearances and Xavier's first appearance in the NCAA Tournament Elite Eight. Matta won two Atlantic 10 regular-season championships in his first two years behind the play of National Player of the Year David West. Following Matta's second year, West was drafted in the first round of the 2003 NBA draft by the New Orleans Hornets. With West's departure, seniors Lionel Chalmers, Romain Sato and Anthony Myles became the team's cornerstone for the 2003–04 season. After a 10–9 start, Xavier closed the season by winning 16 of its last 18 games. "The Run", as it became known, left Xavier 3 points shy of making the program's first NCAA Final Four appearance.

Sean Miller era
The summer following Xavier's first Elite Eight appearance, Matta was offered and accepted the position of head men's basketball coach at Ohio State. Xavier Athletic Director, Dawn Rogers, quickly promoted Xavier Associate Head Coach Sean Miller. From 2004 to 2009, Miller compiled a record of 120–47. Advancing to the NCAA Tournament in four of his five seasons as head coach, Miller led the Musketeers to another Elite Eight appearance in 2008 and a Sweet Sixteen appearance in 2009. During Miller's tenure as head coach, Xavier continued to shed the "mid-major" label and separate itself as one of the country's premier college basketball programs. Miller's NCAA Tournament success, aggressive non-conference scheduling and national recruiting allowed Xavier to be recognized with the likes of Memphis and Gonzaga as one of the premier basketball programs. After turning away interest from many programs, Sean Miller left Xavier to become the head basketball coach at Arizona.

Chris Mack era
On April 15, 2009, Xavier's Athletic Director named Xavier Assistant Coach Chris Mack as the 17th head basketball coach in the program's history. A Cincinnati native and Xavier graduate, Mack compiled a record of 26–9 in his first year as head coach. Behind the play of 2010 NBA draft pick Jordan Crawford, Xavier advanced to the NCAA Tournament's Sweet Sixteen for a third straight season. Chris Mack, the 2009–10 Basketball Times Rookie Coach of the Year, was the first Xavier head coach to lead the Musketeers to the Sweet Sixteen in his first season at the helm. With a 14–2 record in Atlantic 10 play, Xavier also won a share of their fourth straight conference championship.

Finishing with a 24–8 overall record including a 15–1 record in the A-10, Mack lead the Musketeers to a fifth consecutive A-10 title and another NCAA tournament berth in 2010–11.

In a 2011–12 season filled with highs and lows. The early season was marred by the Crosstown Shootout brawl in their yearly rivalry game against Cincinnati. The Musketeers had reached as high as #8 in the AP Poll before numerous suspensions from the Crosstown Shootout brawl lead to the team losing 5 of their next 6 games. Xavier rebounded from this ugly incident and reached Mack's second Sweet Sixteen.

In 2013, Xavier joined the newly reconstituted Big East Conference following Big East conference realignment. Xavier became one of the new members of the new 10-team Big East with the "Catholic 7" (DePaul, Georgetown, Marquette, Providence, Seton Hall, St. John's, and Villanova) plus Butler and Creighton. Xavier finished their first season in the Big East with a record of 21–13, 10–8 to finish Big East play in a tie for third place. They received a bid to the NCAA tournament, but lost in the First Round (First Four).

The 2014–15 season also saw a return to the Sweet Sixteen for the Musketeers. From 2008 to 2015, Xavier made five Sweet Sixteens, tied for third in the nation over that span behind only Louisville and Michigan State. The 2015–16 team finished second in the Big East to Villanova, Xavier's highest finish in the Big East, and advanced to the Second Round of the NCAA tournament.

In 2017, Mack led Xavier to a 24–14 season and got the 11th seed in the West and advanced to the Elite Eight by defeating 6th seed Maryland, 3rd seed Florida State, and 2nd seed Arizona. In the Elite Eight they lost to Gonzaga.

Mack's 215 wins concluding the 2017–18 season placed him first in all-time wins in Xavier history.

Travis Steele era
On March 27, 2018, Mack was named the head coach at the University of Louisville. Four days after Mack left Xavier for Louisville, longtime Xavier assistant coach Travis Steele was named head coach of the Musketeers. After missing the NCAA Tournament for the fourth consecutive year, Steele was fired on March 16, 2022.

2nd Sean Miller era
Only three days after the firing of Travis Steele, Xavier hired former coach Sean Miller as his replacement. During the period in between Steele’s exit and Miller’s full installation as head coach, Jonas Hayes served as interim. Hayes would lead the Musketeers to their second-ever NIT Championship.

Home courts

Cintas Center
Xavier currently plays its home games at the Cintas Center, a 10,224 seat multi-purpose arena that opened in 2000. The Cintas Center is the fifth different home site in program history.

At Cintas Center, Xavier enjoys one of the nation's best home court advantages. As of April 2018 the Musketeers have compiled a 258–41 (an .863 winning percentage) record since moving to its on-campus home in 2000. Xavier enjoyed a 15–0 mark at home during the 2009–10, its only perfect record for a season at Cintas Center. During the 2017–2018 season, the Musketeers set a Cintas Center record with 17 home victories. The building was named the #3 "Toughest Place to Play" on EA Sports' NCAA Basketball '10. In August 2018 the NCAA named it as the 8th toughest home court in college basketball.

Through the 2018–2019 season, Cintas Center has hosted 3,011,308 fans for Xavier home games and the Musketeers have averaged 10,071 fans (better than 98% capacity) per game during that time. The 2017–2018 season marked the highest average attendance in Cintas Center history with an average 10,475 (over 102% capacity) Musketeer fans at each home game.

Cincinnati Gardens
The Musketeers played their final season at Cincinnati Gardens in 1999–2000. Located 2 miles from the Xavier campus, the Gardens was the home court for the Xavier Musketeers since 1983–84 season.

The Xavier men's team played all of its regular season games off campus at the Cincinnati Gardens for 17 years, beginning with the 1983–84 season and ending with an NIT game against Marquette in the 1999–2000 season. The only exception was a game against Florida International that was played at Schmidt Fieldhouse on January 9, 1988.

Xavier compiled an impressive 215–25 (.896) record after moving to the Gardens in the 1983–84 season, including 14–1 in its final season.

Schmidt Fieldhouse
Prior to moving to the Cincinnati Gardens in the 1983–84 season, Xavier called Schmidt Fieldhouse home. Located on the west side of the Xavier Campus, Xavier compiled an impressive 326–129 (.716) record at the Fieldhouse.
 
Until opening Cintas Center, the men's basketball team had only played one regular season game on campus since early in the 1983–84 season. Xavier scored a school-record point total in a 125–84 win over Florida International on Saturday, January 9, 1988.

Other home courts
The Musketeers have also used Riverfront Coliseum and the Fenwick Club.

Postseason

NCAA tournament results
The Musketeers have appeared in the NCAA tournament 29 times. Their combined record is 28–28.

*Following the introduction of the "First Four" round in 2011, the Round of 64 and Round of 32 were referred to as the Second Round and Third Round, respectively, from 2011 to 2015. Then from 2016 forward, the Round of 64 and Round of 32 are called the First and Second Rounds, as they were prior to 2011.

NCAA Tournament seeding history
The NCAA began seeding the tournament with the 1979 edition.

NIT results
The Musketeers have appeared in the National Invitation Tournament (NIT) nine times. Their combined record is 21–7. They were NIT Champions in 1958 and 2022.

NAIA tournament results
The Musketeers have appeared in the NAIA tournament one time. Their record is 3–2.

Musketeers in the NBA

The following table shows Xavier players selected in the NBA or ABA draft or appearing on an NBA or ABA roster.

Musketeers overseas
, 30 former Xavier players are currently playing professionally overseas.

Romain Sato, 2010 Italian League MVP, won two straight Italian League Championships in 2009 and 2010. More recently, Justin Doellman was named ACB MVP in 2014 while with Valencia. Mark Lyons was the top scorer in the Israel Basketball Premier League in both 2015 and 2017. Zach Hankins plays for Hapoel Jerusalem of the Israeli Basketball Premier League.

Awards

All-Americans
Xavier has a total of 20 players who have won All-American honors during their careers with the program.

Trevon Bluiett
2015–16: USA Today Third Team, Associated Press Honorable Mention
2017–18: Associated Press Second Team, United States Basketball Writers Association Second Team, National Association of Basketball Coaches Second Team, Sporting News Second Team
Lenny Brown
1996–97: Basketball Weekly Honorable Mention
1998–99: John R. Wooden Finalist
Semaj Christon
2012–13: Kyle Macy Freshman All-American (collegeinsider.com)
Jordan Crawford
2009–10: Sporting News Third Team
Myles Davis
2013–14: Kyle Macy Freshman All-American (collegeinsider.com)
Jamie Gladden
1992–93: Associated Press Honorable Mention
1989–90:Basketball Times Freshman Fifth Team
Brian Grant
1990–91: Basketball Times Freshman Seventh Team
1993–94: John R. Wooden Finalist Associated Press Honorable Mention
Anthony Hicks
1982–83: Sporting News Honorable Mention, Associated Press Honorable Mention
Tyrone Hill
1988–89: Associated Press Honorable Mention
1989–90: Basketball Times Third Team, Associated Press Honorable Mention
Tu Holloway
2010–11: Associated Press, Fox Sports, and Sporting News Magazine Third-team All-American
T.J. Johnson
1994–95 Basketball Weekly Freshman Honorable Mention

Byron Larkin
1984–85: Basketball Weekly All-Freshman Second Team, Basketball Times All-Freshman Team
1985–86: Associated Press Honorable Mention
1986–87: Sporting News Honorable Mention
1987–88: United Press International Second Team, Scripps Howard Second Team, Associated Press Third Team
Gary Massa
1977–78: Basketball Weekly All-Freshman Team
James Posey
1998–99: College Hoops Insider "Top 15", John R. Wooden Finalist
Bob Quick
1967–68: Associated Press Honorable Mention
Romain Sato
2003–04: Associated Press Honorable Mention
Hank Stein
1957–58: Converse Second Team
1958–59: United Press International Third Team
Edmond Sumner
2015–16: Kyle Macy Freshman All-American (collegeinsider.com)

Steve Thomas
1963–64: Basketball News First Team, Helms Foundation First Team, AP, United Press International and Sporting News Honorable Mention
Brian Thornton
2005–06: ESPN the Magazine, COSIDA All American
David West
2000–01: Associated Press Honorable Mention
2001–02: Associated Press Second Team, United States Basketball Writers Association Second Team, Basketball Times Second Team, FOXSports.com Second Team, National Association of Basketball Coaches Third Team, Sporting News Third Team, Basketball America Third Team, Dick Vitale's "Rolls Royce Super Five", collegeinsider.com All-American, John R. Wooden Finalist
2002–03: Associated Press First Team & AP National Player of the Year, United States Basketball Writers Association First Team & USBWA National Player of the Year, Basketball Times First Team & BT National Player of the Year, National Association of Basketball Coaches First Team, John R. Wooden First Team, ESPN.com First Team, Sporting News First Team, Dick Vitale's "Rolls Royce Super Five", collegeinsider.com All-American & collegeinsider.com National MVP, NABC/Pete Newell Big Man of the Year.

Conference Player of the Year

Retired numbers

Xavier has retired jersey numbers for four players in their history.

Former university President Fr. James Hoff has also had a "jersey" retired in memory of all that he contributed to the school and basketball program. This was unveiled before a 2004 meeting with Creighton, where Hoff was vice president of university relations and President of the Creighton Foundation. Fr. Hoff died from cancer in 2004.

Coaching history

Chart Data

Basketball and academics

NCAA academic progress rate
In May 2010, the NCAA honored a school-record tying eight Xavier University athletic programs with Public Recognition Awards for academic excellence. The award is given to the top-ten percent of teams in each sport based on the NCAA Academic Progress Rate. The APR is a term-by-term progress for every student-athlete in Division I athletics. Out of the 65 teams to make the 2010 NCAA tournament Xavier had the 11th highest Academic Progress Rate.

Graduation
Since 1986, Xavier has graduated every men's basketball player that has exhausted his eligibility.

Sister Rose Ann Fleming
During the 2010 NCAA tournament Xavier's Academic Advisor Sister Rose Ann Fleming garnered considerable national attention for the role she has played in the program's academic success. Fleming was featured in The New York Times, The Wall Street Journal and on both ABC's Good Morning America and NBC Nightly News. Fleming has over 40 years of experience as an educator. She was president of Cincinnati's Summit Country Day School from 1975 to 1976 and president of Trinity College in Washington, D.C. from 1976 to 1982.
In addition to the national recognition she received during the 2010 NCAA tournament she has also been featured in Reader's Digest, Woman's Day, was voted one of the Cincinnati Enquirer's Women of the Year, and was the subject of a promotional spot on The Family Channel.

Rivalries

Crosstown Shootout
Xavier's main rival is the University of Cincinnati. The two schools play annually in the Skyline Chili Crosstown Shootout. Xavier's record in the Shootout is 38–51.

Other rivals
Xavier and Dayton play for the Blackburn/McCafferty Trophy, named for former coaches at the respective universities. Dayton has not beaten Xavier in Cincinnati since 1981. Dayton maintains a lead in the overall series 85–76. However, Xavier won nine straight games against Dayton between March 1991 and December 1994, and went 24–8 between the 2001–02 and 2015–16 seasons.

Xavier also maintains a heated rivalry with Butler, with the Musketeers leading the overall series, 44–24. Xavier won four of the six games between the teams during the 2020–21 and 2021–22 seasons, sweeping the four regular-season matchups and losing each year to Butler in the Big East tournament.

Between the 2009–10 and 2019–20 seasons, Xavier played Wake Forest seven times in a series known as the Skip Prosser Classic, named for the former coach of both schools. Xavier won four of the seven games played.

Notes

References

External links